Stone Old Alleynians Football Club is a football club based in the town of Stone, Staffordshire, England. The club is affiliated to the Staffordshire Football Association.

History

The club's name derives from its foundation in 1962 with a team of former pupils, with some teachers and current pupils, of Alleyne's Grammar School, Stone, Staffordshire (now Alleyne's Academy). The club started in Division 4 of the Stafford Amateur League, gaining promotion to Division 3 in their second season. The following season saw them promoted again and further promotion followed as they finished as champions of Division 2. The 1970–71 season saw the club win the league for the first time, and then winning it again a further 3 times.

The club joined the North Staffs Alliance League for the start of the 1980–81 season. When the league was split into two, the club was essentially relegated to Division one, they  came back to the Premier division as runners-up at the end of the 1987–88 season. In 1992 the team moved to the Staffordshire County League. The 2007–08 season saw the club move to Division 2 of the West Midlands (Regional) League. After finishing 4th in the 2009–10 season the club won promotion to division one.

The 2014–15 season saw the club enter the F.A. Vase for the first time and finish runners up in Division one earning promotion to the Premier division of the West Midlands (Regional) League. After the FA reorganised the English football league system, the club found they had been moved to Division one of the North West Counties League for the start of the 2018–19 season. The 2019–20 season saw the club make their debut in the FA Cup. In 2021 they were promoted to the Premier Division of the Midland League based on their results in the abandoned 2019–20 and 2020–21 seasons.

Ground
The club play their home games at King's Park, Meir Heath, Stoke-on-Trent, after moving there for the 2021–22 season. This occurred following a non-league lower division reshuffle by the FA in May, Stone were moved from the North West Counties Football League to the Midland Football League.They were promoted to Step 5 of the National League System (Step 9 of the English Football Pyramid) and thus will play in the Premier Division. As a result, in order to comply with league ground standards, the club has moved away from home of 15 years Wellbeing Park. Their teams will now play at Kings Park in Meir Heath, the former ground of Meir KA FC. The pitch is located seven miles away from Wellbeing Park, a 13-minute car drive.

Honours

MID STAFFS LEAGUE
DIV 1 :- Champions 1971–72; 1974–75; 1978–79 
Div 2:- Champions 1965–66; 1980–81 
Div 3:- Runners-up 1978–79 
Div 4:- Runners-up 1963–64 
Borough Cup:- Winners 1978–79; Runners-up 1972–73; 1975–76 
Div 2 Cup:- Winners 1983–84 
Pageant Cup:- Winners 1974–75; 1975–76; Runners-up 1972–74; 1978–79; 1983–84 
JW Hunt Cup Final – Runners up 2015–16

STAFFS ALLIANCE LEAGUE
League Cup:- Runners-up 1981–82 

STONE CHARITY CUP
Winners 1968–69; 1971–74; 1974–75 
Runners-up 1972–73

UTTOXETER CHARITY CUP
Runners-up 1981–82; 1983–84

STAFFS PRESIDENTS CUP (Southern Area)
Runners-up 1963–64

BOURNE SPORTS TROPHY
Runners-up 2004–05

References

External links

Football clubs in Staffordshire
West Midlands (Regional) League
Stone, Staffordshire
Football clubs in England
North West Counties Football League clubs
Association football clubs established in 1962
1962 establishments in England
Midland Football League